Mas Que Alcanzar una estrella (Album) is the soundtrack to the film Mas Que Alcanzar una estrella. It was released in 1992. The album includes songs by artists such as Eduardo Capetillo, Mariana Garza, and Ricky Martin, among others.
In the movie, Muñecos de Papel is formed by Ricky Martin, Bibi Gaytan, Alejandro Ibarra and Lorena Rojas. It is unclear whether they contributed vocals for "Sha La La La" and "Apertura", which are simply credited to Various (Various).
The song "Mas que alcanzar una estrella" premiered during the closing credits of the last episode of Alcanzar una estrella II, and was also included in Eduardo Capetillo's first solo album Dame una noche.
Mariana Garza's "Contra tu cuerpo" was the third opening song for Alcanzar una estrella in 1990, but the full version remain unreleased until this album.
"Dime que me quieres" had already been a hit single from Ricky Martin's debut album the previous year.

Track listing

 "SHA LA LA LA (Transas e Caretas)" - Varios
 "MAS QUE ALCANZAR UNA ESTRELLA" - Eduardo Capetillo
 "ALARMALA DE TOS" - Botellita de Jerez 
 "MONA LISA" - Cita
 "ARDIENTE" - Alex Ibarra    
 "APERTURA" - Varios
 "DIME QUE ME QUIERES" - Ricky Martin   
 "EL SALVAVIDAS" - Botellita de Jerez 
 "CONTRA TU CUERPO" - Mariana Garza
 "ALEGRÍA PARA EL MUNDO" - Flor Yvon

Film soundtracks
1992 soundtrack albums